Beyond Warped Live Music Series is a Dualdisc DVD/CD by the Huntington Beach, California punk rock band Guttermouth, released in 2005 by Immergent Records. The DVD side of the disc contains a 9-song live performance by the band on the 2004 Warped Tour, filmed in high definition and mixed in 5.1 Dolby surround sound. It also contains audio tracks of the studio album versions of each song from the setlist. The CD side of the disc contains the studio album versions of all 9 songs from the setlist. Some of the songs are mistitled on the album sleeve and DVD menus.

Track listing
All songs written by Guttermouth
"Party of Two (Your Table is Ready)"  – 2:54
"1, 2, 3...Slam!"  – 1:46
"Lucky the Donkey"  – 1:45
"Do the Hustle"*  – 2:10
"Wasted Lives"  – 2:10
"Octopus Hairpiece"  – 2:22
"Bruce Lee vs. the KISS Army"  – 1:30
"Lipstick"**  – 2:53
"Perfect World"  – 1:54

*Mistitled as "Skater's Anthem" on album sleeve and DVD menu
**Mistitled as "Mom" on album sleeve and DVD menu

Personnel
Mark Adkins - vocals
Scott Sheldon - guitar
Donald Horne - guitar
Kevin Clark - Bass
Brian Scott Doyle - drums

Album information
Record label: Immergent Records
Live DVD portion recorded on the 2004 Warped Tour
All songs written by Mark Adkins and Scott Sheldon

Guttermouth albums
2005 live albums
2005 video albums
Live video albums